The men's welterweight (80 kilograms) event at the 2014 Asian Games took place on 1 October 2014 at Ganghwa Dolmens Gymnasium, Incheon, South Korea.

A total of sixteen competitors from sixteen countries competed in this event, limited to fighters whose body weight was less than 80 kilograms.

Mehdi Khodabakhshi from Islamic Republic of Iran won the gold medal after defeating Maksim Rafalovich from Uzbekistan in the gold medal match 5–1.

The bronze medal was shared by both semifinal losers Qiao Sen of People's Republics of China and Farkhod Negmatov from Tajikistan.

Schedule
All times are Korea Standard Time (UTC+09:00)

Results

References

External links
Official website

Taekwondo at the 2014 Asian Games